The chestnut thrush (Turdus rubrocanus) is a species of bird in the family Turdidae. It breeds in the western Himalayas and central/southwestern China; it winters in Eastern Himalaya and northern Southeast Asia. Its natural habitat is temperate forests.

Gallery

References

External links
Images at ADW

chestnut thrush
Birds of Pakistan
Birds of North India
Birds of Tibet
Birds of Central China
chestnut thrush
chestnut thrush
chestnut thrush
Taxonomy articles created by Polbot